The South Wales Traverse is a long distance fell running challenge across the mountains of south Wales.

The aim is for challengers to complete the route on foot within 24 hours. The route takes in the mountain ranges of the Black Mountain, Carmarthenshire Fans, Fforest Fawr, Central Brecon Beacons, and the Black Mountains, across most of the Brecon Beacons National Park. Arguably, some of the peaks are points along the ridges rather than true summits in their own right but some consider this to add to the theme of a linear long distance challenge. Challengers may start at either end, but traditionally it is run from west to east so that both the prevailing wind can be from behind and 60% of the ascent can be completed in the first half.

The Traverse is considered by many who have completed it to be the Southern Britain equivalent of rounds like the Bob Graham. However, it has seen far fewer successful completions than these rounds (around 40 finishers by October 2020), due to the relatively low numbers of challengers who attempt it each year.

The fastest men's time for the Traverse is 14 hours 13 minutes by Damian Hall on 15 October 2020. The women's record is held by Helen Brown with a time of 18 hours 48 minutes set on 26 September 2020.

The challenge is used to be referred to as the "Brecon Beacons Traverse", but this only cites the relatively short section from Storey Arms to Talybont over the Central Beacons failing to recognise the wider significance of the challenge.

Route

Below is a list of the summits that must be visited starting at Pen Rhiw-Wen running west to East.

Route profile

Below is a profile of the route, again starting at Pen Rhiw Wen, running west to East.

See also
http://www.mdcwales.org.uk/Newsletter/Newsletter_2005/mdcnewsjuly2005.pdf - Mynyddwyr De Cymru newsletter article on a group traverse – page 4

References

Brecon Beacons National Park
Fell running challenges
Geography of Powys
Sport in Wales